Pierwsza miłość (English: First Love) is a Polish soap opera set in Wrocław, Poland. It has been broadcast continually on the Polsat television channel since November 4, 2004. It currently airs at 6:00pm CET from Monday to Friday. Scenes from the show were taken and redubbed for a sketch in the television comedy Time Trumpet (2006), which was aired in Britain, and later formed the basis of the sitcom Soupy Norman (2007) on RTÉ in Ireland.

Cast

Current Cast Members

References

External links
  
 

2004 Polish television series debuts
Polish television soap operas
2000s Polish television series
2010s Polish television series
2020s Polish television series
Polsat original programming